Being Myself is the debut studio album by American rapper Juvenile. It was released on February 7, 1995, by Warlock Records. Juvenile was 19 years old. The album was remixed and re-released in 1999 to capitalize off of Juvenile's success after 400 Degreez, with an alternate cover featuring Juvenile in a tub full of money.

Track listing 
 "Intro" – 0:57
 "Betcha' 20 Dollars [Bounce II]" – 5:41
 "What Cha Gotta Do" – 0:42
 "G-Ing Men" (featuring Ivan) – 3:59
 "Powder Bag" – 5:27
 "Pass Azz 'Nigga" – 4:07
 "U Can't C Me" – 4:54
 "Shake Dat Azz" – 6:10
 "Somethin' I Forgot/I Blowed" – 6:10
 "Sling It to Tha Back" – 4:37
 "Conversation With the Man Above" – 4:40
 "Shout Out" – 0:58
 "Radio Dial" – 0:34

References 

Juvenile (rapper) albums
1995 debut albums